Anouk Mels (born 5 February 1971) is a Dutch former softball player. She competed in the women's tournament at the 1996 Summer Olympics.

A left-handed pitcher, Mels played professional softball from 1988 to 1999, and made a return from 2007 to 2009. She was a four-time Dutch League MVP, and a two-time European Cup MVP, also playing for clubs in New Zealand, Japan, and Italy. Mels also made 43 appearances with the national softball team.

References

External links
 

1971 births
Living people
Dutch softball players
Olympic softball players of the Netherlands
Softball players at the 1996 Summer Olympics
People from Hoorn
Dutch expatriate sportspeople in New Zealand
Dutch expatriate sportspeople in Japan
Dutch expatriate sportspeople in Italy
Sportspeople from North Holland